The western water rat (Hydromys hussoni) is a semiaquatic species of rodent in the family Muridae.
It is found in West Papua, Indonesia and Papua New Guinea.
It is threatened by habitat loss.

References

Hydromys
Rodents of Papua New Guinea
Mammals of Western New Guinea
Mammals described in 1982
Taxonomy articles created by Polbot
Endemic fauna of New Guinea
Taxa named by Guy Musser
Rodents of New Guinea